Besnier may refer to:

 Besnier (locksmith), a French who attempted to fly using two paddle-like wings (1678); see Wright Brothers National Memorial
 Emmanuel Besnier (born 1971), French businessman
 Ernest Besnier (1831–1909), French dermatologist
 Jean-Michel Besnier (born c. 1968), French billionaire heir and major shareholder of Lactalis
 Marie Besnier Beauvalot (born c. 1981), French billionaire heiress and major shareholder of Lactalis
 Michel Besnier (1928–2000), former CEO of Lactalis
 Maurice Besnier (1873–1933), French historian
 Besnier Boeck disease, a systemic granulomatous inflammatory disease characterized by non-caseating granulomas